The Lost String (also known as La Corde Perdue) is a documentary film on American alternative guitarist Marc Ribot directed by French film maker Anaïs Prosaïc.

Synopsis 
Drawing from performance and conversation, the film explores Marc's multifaceted New York City art soul and his commitment to downtown music as he travels from one place to the other. It features performances of a range of Ribot's music and appearances by Anthony Coleman, Brad Jones, EJ Rodriguez, Los Cubanos Postizos, Catherine Janiaux, The Lounge Lizards, Shrek, Christine Bard, Ted Reichman, John Zorn, Ned Rothenberg, Sim Caine, Bruce Cox, Dave Hofstra and Arto Lindsay.

References 

Documentary films about rock music and musicians
2007 films